The Island Packet 27 is an American sailboat that was designed by Robert K. Johnson as a cruiser and first built in 1984.

Production
The design was built by Island Packet Yachts in the United States between 1984 and 1992. A total of 243 examples were completed, but it is now out of production.

Design
The Island Packet 27 is a recreational keelboat, built predominantly of fiberglass, with teak wood trim and a teak and holly cabin sole. It is a Cutter-rigged sloop; with a spooned raked stem; a vertical transom; a rudder mounted to the keel, controlled by a wheel and a fixed long keel or optional long keel and centerboard. It displaces  and carries  of ballast.

The mainsheet traveler is on the rear taffrail. The cockpit features two jib winches and two halyard winches. The cockpit has room for eight adults and includes an icebox. There is a bowsprit with an anchor roller.

The galley is located on the port side of the boat and includes a two-burner alcohol-fired stove and optional pressure water supply. The head is located just aft of the forward "V"-berth, on the starboard side. Additional sleeping accommodation is provided by a cabin settee, which converts to a double berth, plus a single berth to port. The cabin table folds up against the bulkhead.

Cabin ventilation consists of six opening ports and a forward hatch.

Operational history
In a review, Richard Sherwood wrote of the design, "The keel model is standard, the centerboard version available at additional cost. The Packet is a cruiser, not intended for racing. The broad beam gives an unusually spacious interior."

See also
List of sailing boat types

Similar sailboats
Aloha 27
C&C 27
Cal 27
Cal 2-27
Cal 3-27
Catalina 27
Crown 28
CS 27
Express 27
Fantasia 27
Halman Horizon
Hotfoot 27
Hullmaster 27
Hunter 27
Hunter 27-2
Hunter 27-3
Irwin 27 
Mirage 27 (Perry)
Mirage 27 (Schmidt)
O'Day 272
Orion 27-2
Tanzer 27
Watkins 27
Watkins 27P

References

Keelboats
1980s sailboat type designs
Sailing yachts
Sailboat type designs by Robert K. Johnson
Sailboat types built by Island Packet Yachts